mononymously known by her ring name Hazuki is a Japanese professional wrestler currently working for the professional wrestling promotion World Wonder Ring Stardom.

Professional wrestling career

World Wonder Ring Stardom

(2014-2019)

Hazuki passed the test to become a wrestler for Stardom on July 5, 2014. On July 6, 2014, she debuted in a losing effort against Koguma.

in December 2014, she won the Rookie of Stardom tournament.

On November 20, 2016, she changed her name to "HZK" and joined the Stardom unit Queen's Quest after a 15-month hiatus. The unit saw immediate success as Queen's Quest captured the Artist of Stardom Championship on January 7, 2017, which was the first of Hazuki's four reigns.

On April 15, 2018, at the 2018 Stardom Draft, she left Queen's Quest as she was drafted to Oedo Tai. On April 17, 2018, she changed her name from HZK to Hazuki.

On December 24, 2018, she captured the High Speed Championship by defeating Mary Apache.

At Stardom Cinderella Tournament 2019, Hazuki defeated Bea Priestley in the first rounds but fell short to Starlight Kid in the second rounds. On December 24, 2019 she retired from professional wrestling after a match against Natsuko Tora.

Return (2021-present)
On August 29, 2021, on the eighth night of the Stardom 5 Star Grand Prix 2021, Hazuki made her professional wrestling return by confronting Mayu Iwatani after her match with Lady C, taking issue on how outsiders have taken over the promotion during her absence. It was announced that she will be making her official in-ring return at Stardom 10th Anniversary Grand Final Osaka Dream Cinderella on October 9 where she would face Koguma. At the event, Hazuki succeeded in defeating Koguma, after the main event Hazuki came out and challenged Utami Hayashishita for the World of Stardom Championship. She also joined Mayu Iwatani's stable Stars. At Kawasaki Super Wars, the first event of the Stardom Super Wars trilogy which took place on November 3, 2021, Hazuki unsuccessfully challenged Hayashishita for the "red belt". At Tokyo Super Wars on November 27, she teamed up with her stablemates Mayu Iwatani and Hanan to defeat Oedo Tai (Saki Kashima, Fukigen Death and Rina). At Osaka Super Wars, the final event of the trilogy from December 18, Hazuki teamed up with Mayu Iwatani and Koguma and took part in a ¥10 Million Unit Tournament which was also contested for the Artist of Stardom Championship by first defeating Cosmic Angels (Tam Nakano, Mina Shirakawa and Unagi Sayaka) in the semi finals, and eventually falling short to the championsMaiHimePoi (Maika, Natsupoi and Himeka) in the finals on the same night as a result of a Six-woman tag team ladder match. At Stardom Dream Queendom on December 29, 2021, Hazuki teamed up with Momo Watanabe in a losing effort against Mayu Iwatani and Takumi Iroha.

On January 9, 2022, Hazuki and Koguma defeated Alto Livello Kabaliwan (Giulia & Syuri) to win Goddess of Stardom Championship at Stardom in Korakuen Hall. At Stardom Nagoya Supreme Fight on January 29, they scored their first successful defense against MaiHime (Maika and Himeka). At Stardom Cinderella Journey on February 23, 2022, they defended the titles again against Mina Shirakawa and Unagi Sayaka. On the first night of the Stardom World Climax 2022 of March 26, Hazuki and Koguma dropped the Goddess of Stardom Championship to Black Desire (Momo Watanabe and Starlight Kid). One night later, Hazuki would fall short to Watanabe in a singles match. At the Stardom Cinderella Tournament 2022, Hazuki made it to the semifinals where she fell short to Koguma. At Stardom Golden Week Fight Tour on May 5, 2022, Hazuki and Koguma recaptured the Goddess of Stardom Championship from Momo Watanabe and Starlight Kid. At Stardom Flashing Champions, Hazuki and Koguna successfully defended the titles against Giulia and Thekla. At Stardom Fight in the Top on June 26, 2022, Hazuki teamed up with Mayu Iwatani and Koguma to defeat (Utami Hayashishita, AZM and Saya Kamitani) in a six-woman tag team steel cage match. At Mid Summer Champions in Tokyo, the first event of the Stardom Mid Summer Champions which took place on July 9, 2022, Hazuki teamed up with Mayu Iwatani, Koguma and Saya Iida in a losing effort against Oedo Tai (Saki Kashima, Ruaka, Rina and Fukigen Death). At Mid Summer Champions in Nagoya on July 24, Hazuki and Koguma defended the Goddess of Stardom Championship against God's Eye (Ami Sourei and Mirai). At Stardom in Showcase vol.1 on July 23, 2022, Hazuki participated in a Nagoya rumble match won by Gokigen Death. At Stardom 5 Star Grand Prix 2022, Hazuki fought in the "Blue Goddess" block where she scored a total of 14 points after competing against Giulia, Mirai, Mayu Iwatani, Suzu Suzuki, Saya Kamitani, Natsupoi, Momo Watanabe, Ami Sourei, Mina Shirakawa, Saya Iida and Hanan. At Stardom x Stardom: Nagoya Midsummer Encounter on August 21, 2022, Hazuki and Koguma dropped the Goddess of Stardom titles to Tam Nakano and Natsupoi.

New Japan Pro Wrestling (2019)
At New Japan Pro Wrestling and Ring of Honor promoted show G1 Supercard, she achieved her goal by having a match in the Madison Square Garden. She worked with Jenny Rose and Kagetsu to defeat Hana Kimura, Stella Grey and Sumie Sakai.

Championships and accomplishments
Pro Wrestling Illustrated
 Ranked No. 5 of the top 100 tag team in the PWI Tag Team 100 in 2022 
 Ranked No. 101 of the top 150 female wrestlers in the PWI Women's 150 in 2022
World Wonder Ring Stardom
High Speed Championship (1 time)
Goddess of Stardom Championship (2 times) – with Koguma
Artist of Stardom Championship (4 times) – with Io Shirai & Momo Watanabe (1), Io Shirai & AZM (2), Io Shirai & Viper (1)
Goddesses of Stardom Tag League (2021) – with Koguma
Rookie of Stardom Tournament (2015)
Stardom Year-End Award (3 times)
Best Match Award (2018) 
 Best Tag Team Award (2021) 
 Best Unit Award (2022)

References

1997 births
Living people
Japanese female professional wrestlers
People from Fukuoka Prefecture
Sportspeople from Fukuoka Prefecture
21st-century professional wrestlers
Artist of Stardom Champions
Goddess of Stardom Champions
High Speed Champions